Four frigates of the French Navy have borne the name Didon in honour of Dido: 
 , a  40-gun frigate.
 , a  40-gun frigate.
 , a 46-gun frigate, bore the name Didon during her career.
 , a 60-gun  first rank frigate.

References

French Navy ship names